A street game or street sport is a sport or game that is played on city streets rather than a prepared field.  Street games are usually simply play time activities for children in the most convenient venue.  Some street games have risen to the level of organized tournaments, such as stickball.

When street games are based on organized sports, the rules are highly modified to fit the situation, i.e. manhole covers for bases with cars or buildings for foul lines in stickball. When balls are used in street games, Spaldeens are often used.

Street sports 
Street sports are sports held in urban environments.  Street sports are an expression of the spontaneous, improvisational and creative origins of sport adapted by human ingenuity to the urban environment. In historical terms their origins are traceable to the very earliest evidence of sports in Greek and Roman civilisation.<ref name="Read">Urbanization and the Evolution of the City; Reader, J.; Vintage; (2005)</ref>  Street sports are a hybrid form of sport and reflect the adaptation of conventional sports to the cityscape.  Viewing the city through as a living, bustling, and thriving organism helps to cast light on the nature of that which is urban and to begin to home-in on particular salient features of urban life.  It is only with the advent of this relatively modern perspective on the urban that it has become possible to speak in terms of street sports.  

Parkour artist Sebastien Foucan has defined the sport of Freerunning as a ‘physical art’.  In the words of  Foucan, street sports are "...a philosophy concerned with the quest of personal and social realisation..."  A similar point of view can be found in the notion of the philosophy of urban solo-climbing expounded by Alain Robert.  Likewise, the high-wire walker, Philippe Petit, whose performance include walking between the World Trade Center towers in 1974, has described his 'interventions' on the urban environment as 'art crimes', suggesting their essence is creative and constitutes an expression—an interaction with the city. 

Examples of street games
This is a list of games that are traditionally played by urban children in playgrounds, parking lots, and back streets. They are all games that may be played on a hard surface, like asphalt. They are part of children's street culture, and are notoriously hard to classify rigorously.

Utilizing a rubber ball

Other games

In popular culture
 Street sports in the middle east: The Kite Runner and The Kite Runner (the film adaptation)
 Highwire Walking: Man on Wire, film documenting the background to Petit's high-wire walk between the WTC Towers.
 A 2010 PBS documentary, New York Street Games'', shows the best-known street games played in New York City in the twentieth century, as well as discussing the decline of those games in recent decades.

See also

 Children's game
 List of traditional children's games

References

External links
 Kid's Games: All About Kid's Games
 StreetPlay.com
 Parkour examples
 Playing stickball

Game terminology